Jyri Antero Jaakkola (February 11, 1977 – April 27, 2010) was a Finnish human rights activist. He was on his way to San Juan Copala, a village of indigenous Trique people that has declared itself autonomous, as a human rights observer when he was shot dead by UBISORT, a paramilitary organization connected to Institutional Revolutionary Party. In the attack Alberta Cariño, an activist for the local organization CACTUS, was also shot dead and more than ten people were wounded.

Background

Jaakkola was widely known as a central figure in several alternative movements in Finland. He was involved with S/V Estelle, a sailboat operated on fair trade principles, and sailed to Angola with the ship in 2002.

Death

Jaakkola was murdered in Oaxaca on 27 April 2010. According to Member of the European Parliament Heidi Hautala (Subcommittee on Human Rights) the individual cases allow the discovery of the roots of systematic human rights violations.

Jaakkola's parents want the Finnish government to conduct investigations. In 2012 the murder, two years after his death, the Mexican investigation had not advanced.

See also
 San Juan Copala
 Autonomous Municipality of San Juan Copala

References

External links
 
 An article written by Jyri Jaakkola translated into English
 Parents demand justice for Finn killed in Mexico (Associated Press)
 In Memoriam: Jyri Jaakkola

Finnish political activists
1977 births
2010 deaths
Finnish people murdered abroad
Finnish human rights activists
Deaths by firearm in Mexico
People murdered in Mexico